Khairi Fortt (born March 24, 1992) also known as Khai, is a former American football linebacker and current actor. He was drafted by the New Orleans Saints in the fourth round of the 2014 NFL Draft. He played college football at Penn State and California.

College career
After being selected to play in the 2010 U.S. Army All-American Bowl, Fortt began his college career at Penn State, then transferred to Cal after the 2011 scandal that resulted in extensive sanctions against the Penn State program.

Fortt was a semifinalist for the Dick Butkus Award in 2013, nominating him as one of the best 12 linebackers in college football

Professional career

New Orleans Saints
The New Orleans Saints drafted Fortt in the fourth round of the 2014 NFL Draft. In training camp they made the decision to move him to outside linebacker and emphasize his pass rushing ability. On September 3, 2014, he was placed on the short term injured reserve list, with the possibility of returning to the active roster later in the season. However, Fortt was waived on October 6, 2014.

Cincinnati Bengals
Fortt was claimed off waivers by the Cincinnati Bengals on October 7, 2014.  The Bengals cut Fortt on October 14, 2014. They signed him to the practice squad on October 16, 2014.

Jacksonville Jaguars
The Jacksonville Jaguars signed Fortt to their 53-man roster off of the Cincinnati Bengals practice squad on November 3, 2014. He was waived on August 29, 2015.

Seattle Seahawks
Fortt was signed by the Seattle Seahawks on May 16, 2016. He was released by the Seahawks on June 28, 2016.

Washington Redskins
On January 6, 2017, Fortt signed a reserve/future contract with the Redskins. He was waived by the Redskins on May 15, 2017. During free agency, he was resigned by Washington and brought in for another tryout in D.C.

Acting career
During his stint with the Redksins, Fortt starred in an episode of Discovery ID's: The Perfect Murder as deceased NFL safety Sean Taylor. Fortt also was a contestant on the hit MTV show: Fear Factor in 2018 hosted by American rapper and actor Ludacris, where he was victorious after three grueling challenges.

References

External links
New Orleans Saints bio
California Golden Bears bio

1992 births
Living people
Sportspeople from Stamford, Connecticut
Players of American football from Connecticut
American football linebackers
Penn State Nittany Lions football players
California Golden Bears football players
New Orleans Saints players
Cincinnati Bengals players
Jacksonville Jaguars players
Seattle Seahawks players
Washington Redskins players
Stamford High School (Stamford, Connecticut) alumni